Khurram Shahzad Virk is a Pakistani politician who had been a member of the Provincial Assembly of the Punjab from July 2022 till January 2023.

Political career 
He was elected to the Provincial Assembly of the Punjab from Constituency PP-140 (Sheikhupura-VI) as a candidate of Pakistan Tehreek-e-Insaf (PTI) in 2022 Punjab provincial by-election.

References 

Living people
Pakistani MNAs 2018–2023
Pakistan Tehreek-e-Insaf politicians
Politicians from Lahore
Year of birth missing (living people)